Hartsville is a town in Trousdale County, Tennessee, United States. It is the county seat of Trousdale County, with which it shares a consolidated city-county government. The population of Hartsville was 11,615 as of 2020.

Hartsville now shares with Trousdale County a consolidated city-county government by virtue of a referendum which passed in Trousdale County in 2000.  Despite the city-county government, under Tennessee law,  Hartsville is also considered to be a distinct municipality.  Trousdale County High School is located here, as well a Tennessee Colleges of Applied Technology campus operated by the Tennessee Board of Regents. Trousdale County is one of two counties in Tennessee to have legalized parimutuel betting on horse racing, but no group has ever stepped forward to build a racetrack. Hartsville is located slightly north of the Cumberland River and is approximately fifty miles northeast of Nashville as well as home to Robert Joines.

In 1977, the Tennessee Valley Authority began construction on the Hartsville Nuclear Plant, but cancelled the project in 1984 after spending nearly $2 billion. The plant's unused cooling tower dominates the view south from State Route 25 between Smith County and Trousdale County. In 2016, Corrections Corporation of America (since renamed CoreCivic) opened the Trousdale Turner Correctional Center, a medium-security prison, in Hartsville. The prison became a hot spot for COVID-19 cases in the COVID-19 pandemic, giving the county the highest incidence rate in the U.S. in May 2020, with 1 in 7 residents known to be infected with coronavirus.

History

The first Euro-American settlers arrived in what is now Hartsville in 1797, when the family of James Hart settled along the west bank of the West Fork of Goose Creek, and the family of Charles Donoho settled along the creek's east bank. Donoho erected a mill shortly thereafter, and the town was initially known as Donoho's Mill. James Hart established Hart's Ferry along the Cumberland River several miles to the south, and purchased the Donoho property in 1800. Hartsville was officially recognized as a town in 1817. Donoho's Mill, on the east bank of the creek, had become known as "Damascus," although it merged with Hartsville in 1840 when Hartsville officially incorporated.

During the Civil War, Hartsville was site of the Battle of Hartsville, which took place in 1862.

Julie Hayden, a 17-year old teacher, was murdered by the White Man's League in 1874 in Hartsville.

Trousdale County is noted for having the 4th most TSSAA high school football championships, behind Alcoa, Maryville, and Brentwood Academy. Trousdale County High School won state championships in 1972, 1990, 1993, 1997, 1998, 2005, 2008, 2009, and 2013, and was runner-up in 1973, 1974, 1975, and 2018.

Education
Trousdale County is serviced by three public schools: Trousdale County High School, Trousdale County Elementary School, and Jim B. Satterfield Middle School. In October 2013, Trousdale County school district was awarded the State Collaborative on Reforming Education, or SCORE, Prize winner for the school district that has most dramatically improved student achievement. Trousdale County "serves more than 1,200 students and has significantly narrowed the achievement gap in science between white students and African-American and Hispanic students. It also has shown notable growth on TVAAS in math and Biology I."

Geography
Hartsville is located at  (36.391617, -86.160172). The town's business district is situated along the West Fork of Goose Creek, which flows into Trousdale County from the hills to the north and empties into the Old Hickory Lake impoundment of the Cumberland River several miles to the south. A large hill rises immediately to the west of the business district and overlooks the entire eastern half of the county.

Hartsville lies at the junction of State Route 25, which connects the town with Carthage to the southeast and Sumner County to the west, and State Route 141, which connects Hartsville with Lebanon to the south and Macon County to the north.

Demographics

As of the census of 2000, there were 2,395 people, 938 households, and 601 families residing in the town. The population density was 673.5 people per square mile (259.8/km2). There were 1,043 housing units at an average density of 293.3 per square mile (113.1/km2). The racial makeup of the town was 75.70% White, 22.46% African American, 0.29% Native American, 0.21% Asian, 0.04% Pacific Islander, 0.84% from other races, and 0.46% from two or more races. Hispanic or Latino of any race were 1.46% of the population.

There were 938 households, out of which 29.1% had children under the age of 18 living with them, 42.2% were married couples living together, 18.9% had a female householder with no husband present, and 35.9% were non-families. 31.2% of all households were made up of individuals, and 13.8% had someone living alone who was 65 years of age or older. The average household size was 2.38 and the average family size was 2.96.

In the town, the population was spread out, with 23.3% under the age of 18, 8.9% from 18 to 24, 26.1% from 25 to 44, 22.5% from 45 to 64, and 19.1% who were 65 years of age or older. The median age was 39 years. For every 100 females, there were 87.4 males. For every 100 females age 18 and over, there were 81.2 males.

The median income for a household in the town was $26,797, and the median income for a family was $33,523. Males had a median income of $27,232 versus $21,429 for females. The per capita income for the town was $14,226. About 17.0% of families and 19.7% of the population were below the poverty line, including 21.0% of those under age 18 and 24.3% of those age 65 or over.

Notable people
Bob Dyer, radio and television host.
William Lauderdale, planter and soldier who fought in the War of 1812 and Second Seminole War.
John Martin, lawyer and politician from Hartsville, Tennessee. Martin represented Kansas in the United States Senate from 1893 until 1895.

Government
The legislative authority of the Hartsville/Trousdale County Government shall include all legislative authority vested in the former Town of Hartsville and in Trousdale County upon the date of the formation of the Hartsville/Trousdale County Government, as well as all legislative powers vested in metropolitan governments generally, in county governments generally under the Constitution of the State of Tennessee, under laws of general application of the State of Tennessee as the same shall be in effect at or after the date of formation of the Hartsville/Trousdale County Government, or under any private acts applicable to the Town of Hartsville or Trousdale County. The legislative authority of the Hartsville/Trousdale County Government except as otherwise specified in this charter, shall be vested in the Hartsville/Trousdale County Commission, sometimes hereinafter called "Commission." 

The Commission is divided into 10 districts with 2 commissioners per district. The next election cycle for the commission is 2026.

References

External links
 Hartsville — Trousdale County — official site

Towns in Tennessee
Towns in Trousdale County, Tennessee
County seats in Tennessee
Consolidated city-counties